Kirilov (masculine) or Kirilova (feminine) is a Slavic surname shared by the following people:

Andrey Kirilov (born 1967), Russian cross country skier
Dimitri Kirilov (born 1978), Russian professional boxer
Evgeni Kirilov (born 1945), Bulgarian politician
Ivan Kirilov (botanist) (1821–1842), Russian botanist 
Ivan Kirilov (geographer) (1689–1737), Russian geographer and cartographer
Rosen Kirilov (born 1973), Bulgarian football player

See also 
Kirillov (surname)
Chirilov

References

Bulgarian-language surnames
Russian-language surnames
Patronymic surnames
Surnames from given names